William Barbey (1842–1914) was a Swiss botanist and politician. 

William Barbey was born on 14 July 1842 at Genthod in the canton of Geneva. He studied science at the Academy in Geneva and then engineering at the École Centrale de Paris. From 1862 to 1869, he worked in New York City. He married Caroline, the daughter of the prominent botanist Edmond Boissier. After his marriage, he studied botany and undertook botanical research in Spain, Palestine, Greece and Asia Minor. In 1885, he founded the publication Bulletin de l'Herbier Boissier, which in 1910 became the Bulletin de la société botanique de Genève.
 	 	
He built, largely at his own expense, the Yverdon–Saint-Croix railway. However, as a supporter of Sunday observance, he insisted that the trains did not run on that day. He lived in, and was an honorary citizen of, Valeyres-sous-Rances in the canton of Vaud. From 1885 to 1909, he was a Liberal member of the Grand Council of Vaud. He died on 18 November 1914 at Chambésy.

References

External links
 

1842 births
1914 deaths
Scientists from Geneva
Politics of the canton of Vaud
19th-century Swiss botanists
Taxon authorities of Hypericum species
20th-century Swiss botanists